Leslie John Primrose (14 May 1890 – 4 June 1918) was an Australian rules footballer who played with University in the Victorian Football League. He served in the Australian Flying Corps in World War I and took part in dogfights against the German Red Baron unit. He was killed in a plane crash in 1918.

Family
The son of John William Primrose (1866-1919), and Catherine Ellen Primrose (1867-1937), née Dent, Leslie John Primrose was born in Ballarat, Victoria on 14 May 1890.

Football

University (VFL)
Cleared from Golden Point to University on 26 April 1912, he played in 16 senior matches over two seasons (1912-1913).

Military service
Employed as a schoolteacher, Primrose enlisted in the First  AIF on 2 August 1915.

Death
He was killed in action when his plane crashed on its return flight to its base on 4 June 1918.

See also
 List of Victorian Football League players who died in active service

Footnotes

References
 Holmesby, Russell & Main, Jim (2007). The Encyclopedia of AFL Footballers. 7th ed. Melbourne: Bas Publishing.
 Main, J. & Allen, D., "Primrose, Leslie", pp. 154–156 in Main, J. & Allen, D., Fallen – The Ultimate Heroes: Footballers Who Never Returned From War, Crown Content, (Melbourne), 2002. 
 World War One Service Record: Lieutenant Leslie John Primrose, National Archives of Australia.
 World War One Embarkation Roll: Lieutenant Leslie John Primrose, collection of the Australian War Memorial.
 World War One Nominal Roll: Lieutenant Leslie John Primrose, collection of the Australian War Memorial.
 Australian Red Cross Wounded and Missing Files: Lieutenant Leslie John Primrose, collection of the Australian War Memorial.
 Roll of Honour: Lieutenant Leslie John Primrose, Australian War Memorial.
 The Late Lieutenant Primrose, The Hamilton Spectator, (Saturday, 31 August 1918), p.7.

External links
 
 
 Leslie John Primrose, at Western District Families.
 Photograph of Second Lieutenant Leslie John Primrose, No 4 Squadron, Australian Flying Corps, Collection of the Australian War Memorial.
 Group portrait of Officers of No 2 Squadron, Australian Flying Corps, Collection of the Australian War Memorial.
 Original grave at Breuil-le-Sec Cemetery of Lieutenant Leslie John Primrose, No 2 Squadron, photograph in the collection of the Australian War Memorial.
 Lieutenant Leslie John Primrose, Commonwealth War Graves Commission.

1890 births
Australian rules footballers from Victoria (Australia)
University Football Club players
1918 deaths
Australian military personnel killed in World War I